Tentacles (Italian title: Tentacoli) is a 1977 Italian-American horror film directed by Ovidio G. Assonitis (billed in the U.S. version as Oliver Hellman) and starring John Huston, Shelley Winters, Bo Hopkins and Henry Fonda. When numerous people go missing in a seaside resort town, a reporter discovers a rampaging giant octopus is terrorizing the coast. While a marine biologist attempts to stop the octopus before more tourists fall victim to the creature, it appears that a corporation may be connected to the cephalopod's murderous behavior. Although the film was intended to cash in on the success of Jaws, Tentacles also bears numerous resemblances to the 1955 science fiction giant monster horror film It Came from Beneath the Sea.

Plot 
People are turning up dead at Solana Beach, a seaside tourist resort, their skeletons picked clean of flesh and bone marrow. The local Sheriff (Akins) has no leads, but crusading newspaper reporter Ned Turner (Huston) suspects the construction of an underwater tunnel by the Trojan company, owned by Mr. Whitehead (Fonda). Whitehead threatens Turner to leave it alone, but after several more deaths, he interrogates killer whale trainer and marine expert Will Gleason (Hopkins). When two of Gleason's divers are also killed, Gleason goes to investigate himself and determines the attacks are the result of Trojan using ultrasonic drilling techniques where the sound waves have been "above regulated levels," which maddens a giant octopus, causing it to attack and devour human swimmers and boaters whenever it feels similar frequencies. Criticizing him for risking his life, his wife Vicky (Boccardo) joins her sister at the pool. When her sister goes off on a boating expedition and also goes missing, Gleason's wife goes in search...and is also killed by the octopus. In the meantime Turner's sister Tillie (Winters) has taken her young son to a boating race which he is one of the few to miraculously survive. Gleason vows to kill the octopus and takes his trained killer whales out to where his wife was killed. In the end, the octopus is killed by that pair of killer whales while he tries to save another diver.

Cast 
 John Huston as Ned Turner
 Shelley Winters as Tillie Turner
 Bo Hopkins as  Will Gleason
 Henry Fonda as Mr. Whitehead, President of Trojan Construction
 Delia Boccardo as Vicky Gleason
 Cesare Danova as John Corey
 Claude Akins as Sheriff Robards
 Alan Boyd as Mike
 Sherry Buchanan as Judy
 Franco Diogene as Chuck
 Marc Fiorini as Don

Production
The film was produced to capitalize on the success of Steven Spielberg's Jaws, and as such was produced on a much smaller budget of $750,000. It was shot on location in Oceanside, Pismo Beach, and San Diego, California. The aquarium sequences were shot at Marineland of the Pacific in Los Angeles County.

The film's score was done by Italian composer Stelvio Cipriani, who scored the similarly Jaws-inspired films The Great Alligator and Piranha II: The Spawning around the same time.

Release
It was released theatrically by American International Pictures in Italy on February 25, 1977, The film opened in New York on 3 August 1977 and in Los Angeles on 31 August 1977.

The film was released on DVD by MGM in 2005 as part of their Midnite Movies series. The disc was a double feature release, pairing the film with Empire of the Ants. It was released on Blu-ray by Kino Lorber in April 2022.

The film was a box office success, grossing $3,000,000.

Reception
On Rotten Tomatoes, the film holds an approval rating of 0% based on seven reviews, with a weighted average rating of 2.6 out of 10.

Contemporary reviews were also negative. Lawrence Van Gelder of The New York Times called it "an all-too-familiar giant octopus movie" that suffered from "atrocious acting in minor roles," "occasionally poor dubbing" and "a totally unoriginal story". Variety noted that although "John Huston, Shelley Winters and Henry Fonda may bolster prospects", they "are all squandered in this one, thanks to a leaden script plus wooden direction by Oliver Hellman (who's also producer Ovidio Assonitiz)". Linda Gross of the Los Angeles Times dismissed it as "a tedious movie, nightmarishly slow and intermittently out of synch". Tom Milne of The Monthly Film Bulletin declared: "A devastatingly silly rehash of the Jaws formula, atrociously scripted, stiltedly acted, and reaching its low point in a grotesquely maudlin finale where the hero pours his heart out in a pep talk to the whales he has trained to graduate standards of communication". Marjorie Bilbow of Screen International wrote, "The special effects are good and there is a fair amount of suspense before each victim is tentacled. But involvement with the characters is minimal ... the excitement lies only in anticipating when the next plastic victim will get nabbed".

See also 
 List of killer octopus films

References

Footnotes

Sources

External links 
 
 
 
 
 

1977 horror films
1977 films
American International Pictures films
Environmental films
Films about cephalopods
Films shot in California
Italian horror films
American monster movies
American natural horror films
1970s monster movies
Films set in the United States
Films scored by Stelvio Cipriani
English-language Italian films
1970s English-language films
1970s American films
1970s Italian films